Robert O'Connor may refer to:

 Robert O'Connor (author) (born 1959), American novelist
 Robert Emmett O'Connor (1885–1962), American actor
 Rob O'Connor, a character in Hollyoaks

See also
Bob O'Connor (disambiguation)
Robert Connor (disambiguation)